is a former Japanese football player.

Playing career
Takada was born in Hiroshima Prefecture on July 31, 1969. After graduating from Fukuoka University, he joined Japan Football League club Fujita Industries (later Bellmare Hiratsuka, Shonan Bellmare) in 1993. He played many matches as many defensive position, defensive midfielder, left side back and center back. The club won the champions in 1993 and was promoted to J1 League. The club won the champions 1994 Emperor's Cup and 1995 Asian Cup Winners' Cup. However the club finished at bottom place in 1999 and was relegated to J2 League from 2000. He retired end of 2000 season.

Club statistics

References

External links

1969 births
Living people
Fukuoka University alumni
Association football people from Hiroshima Prefecture
Japanese footballers
J1 League players
J2 League players
Japan Football League (1992–1998) players
Shonan Bellmare players
Association football midfielders